Arrive Alive may refer to:
 The 1980 comedy film Arrive Alive
 Arrive Alive, an organization against impaired driving
 "Arrive Alive" (Batwoman), an episode of Batwoman